The basilic vein is a large superficial vein of the upper limb that helps drain parts of the hand and forearm. It originates on the medial (ulnar) side of the dorsal venous network of the hand and travels up the base of the forearm, where its course is generally visible through the skin as it travels in the subcutaneous fat and fascia lying superficial to the muscles. The basilic vein terminates by uniting with the brachial veins to form the axillary vein.

Anatomy

Course 
As it ascends the medial side of the biceps in the arm proper (between the elbow and shoulder), the basilic vein normally perforates the brachial fascia (deep fascia) superior to the medial epicondyle, or even as high as mid-arm.

Tributaries and anastomoses 
Near the region anterior to the cubital fossa (in the bend of the elbow joint), the basilic vein usually communicates with the cephalic vein (the other large superficial vein of the upper extremity) via the median cubital vein. The layout of superficial veins in the forearm is highly variable from person to person, and there is a profuse network of unnamed superficial veins that the basilic vein communicates with.

Around the inferior border of the teres major muscle and just proximal to the basilic vein's termination, the anterior and posterior circumflex humeral veins drain into it.

Clinical significance

Venipuncture 
Along with other superficial veins in the forearm, the basilic vein is an acceptable site for venipuncture. Nevertheless, IV nurses sometimes refer to the basilic vein as the "virgin vein", since with the arm typically supinated during phlebotomy the basilic vein below the elbow becomes awkward to access, and is therefore infrequently used.

Venous grafts 
Vascular surgeons sometimes utilize the basilic vein to create an AV (arteriovenous) fistula or AV graft for hemodialysis access in patients with kidney failure.

Additional images

See also
 Cephalic vein
 Median cubital vein

External links
 
 
 Illustration

References 

Anatomy
Veins of the upper limb
Human surface anatomy
Cardiovascular system
Circulatory system